Paremhat 5 - Coptic Calendar - Paremhat 7

The sixth day of the Coptic month of Paremhat, the seventh month of the Coptic year. In common years, this day corresponds to March 2, of the Julian Calendar, and March 15, of the Gregorian Calendar. This day falls in the Coptic Season of Shemu, the season of the Harvest.

Commemorations

Martyrs 

 The martyrdom of Saint Dioscorus

Saints 

 The departure of saint Theodotus the Confessor, Bishop of Corinth (city on Cyprus)

References 

Days of the Coptic calendar